Full House is the fourth studio album by Frankie Miller, released in 1977.  It features a mix of Miller originals and covers, including a version of John Lennon's "Jealous Guy".  The Andy Fraser composition "Be Good to Yourself" was issued as a single, and reached No. 27 the UK  singles chart, becoming Miller's first chart hit.

Track listing
All tracks composed by Frankie Miller; except where indicated

Side One
"Be Good to Yourself" (Andy Fraser)
"The Doodle Song"
"Jealous Guy" (John Lennon)
"Searching" (Peter Knight, Bob Johnson)
"Love Letters" (Edward Heyman, Victor Young)

Side Two
"Take Good Care of Yourself" (Jimmy Doris)
"Down the Honky Tonk"
"This Love of Mine" (Frankie Miller, Robin Trower)
"Let the Candlelight Shine"
"(I'll Never) Live in Vain"

Charts

Personnel
Frankie Miller - vocals, rhythm guitar, acoustic guitar
Ray Minhinnett - lead guitar
Chrissy Stewart - bass guitar
Jim Hall - piano, organ
Graham Deakin - drums

Special guests
Chris Spedding – guitar
Rabbit – keyboards
Gary Brooker – keyboards
The Memphis Horns – horn section

Production credits
Produced by Chris Thomas
Engineered by Steve Nye
Assisted by Nigel Walker
Orchestral Arrangements on "Searching" by Peter Knight

References

External links

1977 albums
Frankie Miller albums
Chrysalis Records albums
Albums produced by Chris Thomas (record producer)